Frankfurt am Main (A1412) is the second ship of the s of the German Navy. Ordered in 1997, the vessel was constructed in Hamburg by Flensburger Schiffbau-Gesellschaft and was launched on 5 January 2001. Frankfurt am Main was commissioned on 27 May 2002 and is currently in service.

Development and description 

In German, this type of ship is called Einsatzgruppenversorger which can be translated as "task force supplier" though the official translation in English is "combat support ship". They are intended to support German naval units away from their home ports. The ships carry fuel, provisions, ammunition and other matériel and also provide medical services. The ships are named after German cities where German parliaments were placed.

The Berlin-class replenishment ships are the largest vessels of the German Navy. Constructed with a double hull, they have a pronounced bow bulb. The vessels have two replenishment at sea stations, one to each per side of the ship and two electro-hydraulic container and cargo cranes. The Berlin class have capacity for 86 TEUs of shipping containers and can stack 26 TEUs in two layers on the upper deck. The ships have provision for a Marineeinsatzrettungzentrum (MERZ) unit which is a modular operations rescue centre aboard the ship. The MERZ is capable of holding 50 patients and providing them with emergency surgery, intensive care, internal medicine and dental services.

The first two vessels of the class,  and Frankfurt am Main are powered by two MAN Diesel 12V 32/40 diesel-engines, creating  with two reduction gears turning two controllable pitch five-bladed propellers and powering one bow thruster. They have four Deutz-MWM diesel generators. The Berlin-class ships have a helipad aft and a hangar and can support two helicopters, either the Sea King or NH90 models which can be used for vertical replenishment. The vessels are equipped with radar and mine avoidance sonar and one of the radars is situated aft for use during helicopter takeoff and landing.

The Berlin class are armed with four MLG  autocannon for anti-aircraft defence and four  machine guns. The MLG 27 replaced older Bofors /70 guns. The vessels are also fitted for but not with Stinger surface-to-air missile (MANPADS) for point defence. The vessels have a complement of 159 plus 74 embarked.

Construction and career 

The initial plan for the Berlin class comprised four ships. However, in 1994, the number of ships to be ordered was cut back to just one. A second ship was authorized in the 1996 budget and Frankfurt am Main was ordered in June 1998. The ship was constructed by a consortium composed of Flensburger Schiffbau-Gesellschaft which constructed the hull, Lürssen the electrictal systems and Krügerwerft the superstructure, outfitting and sea trials. The ship was laid down on 28 August 2000 and launched on 5 January 2001 at Hamburg. The ship was christened by sponsor Petra Roth, the mayor of Frankfurt am Main. Frankfurt am Main then underwent sea trials beginning on 19 February 2002. She was commissioned on 27 May 2002.

Her first home port was Kiel, since 26 September 2012, she has been stationed at the Heppenser Groden naval base in Wilhelmshaven. Frankfurt am Main worked with  during mock underway replenishment in the 50th iteration of UNITAS Gold on 26 April 2009.

In 2012, the ship was sent to Canada ahead of that nation's procurement of future replenishment ships. This was an attempt to draw Canadian interest in acquiring ship's of a similar design. In 2013, the mission was successful, as the Canadians chose the Berlin class as the basis for their new auxiliary ships.

On 16 March 2017, she was damaged in the evening when entering homeport Wilhelmshaven. When reversing in the port, Frankfurt am Mains stern collided with the concrete porch of the lock island. The ship was repaired at Kiel from June to September. After returning to service, Frankfurt am Main sailed for the Aegean Sea to join Standing NATO Maritime Group 2, remaining with the unit until March 2018.

MERZ was a containerized-based mobile hospital consisting of 26 containers intended to be flexible to adapt to the navy's needs. After the mobile version's destruction, the navy chose to go with a built-in option, with flexibility diminishing in importance. They chose Frankfurt am Main to host the new  (iMERZ) (English: Integrated Marine Rescue Centre). Beginning in February 2020, the ship began a refit to incorporate the iMERZ into the ship's citadel to allow for CBRN defence. The navy intended to construct the iMERZ separately and after opening part of Frankfurt am Mains hull, slide the iMERZ in. However, a manufacturing defect led the iMERZ to be too large for the spot in Frankfurt am Mains hull and had to be rebuilt, leading to delays in the ship's return to sea, which is not expected before 2022.

Notes

Citations

References

 
 
 
 

Berlin-class replenishment ships
2001 ships
Ships built in Hamburg